Madakulam is a neighbourhood in Madurai district of Tamil Nadu state in the peninsular India.

Madakulam has a tank (kanmoi - கண்மாய்) that supplies drinking water to Madurai City and its surrounding areas.

In Madurai, road overbridge connecting Madakulam and T V S Nagar was constructed in the year 2015. The second arm (extension) of Madakulam and T V S Nagar bridge towards Jaihindpuram, of 251 m long, with the project cost of about ₹16.62 crore, is being in construction.

References 

Neighbourhoods and suburbs of Madurai